Leonard "Len" H. Tower Jr. (born June 17, 1949) is a free software activist and one of the founding board members of the Free Software Foundation,
where he contributed to the initial releases of gcc and GNU diff.  He left the Free Software Foundation in 1997.

Birth
Tower was born June 17, 1949 in Astoria, Queens in New York City, U.S.

Academic career 
In 1971, Tower received an SB in biology from the Massachusetts Institute of Technology.  During that time he was Business Manager at The Tech, the student newspaper.

GNU project 
As the FSF's first full-time paid employee, Tower mostly performed administrative tasks including managing mailing lists, newsgroups and requests for information.

In 1986, Tower assisted Richard Stallman with Stallman's initial plan to base the C compiler for the GNU Project on the Pastel compiler Stallman had obtained from Lawrence Livermore Lab. Tower worked on rewriting the existing code from Pastel, a variation of Pascal, into C while Stallman worked on building the new C front end.  Stallman dropped that plan when he discovered the Livermore compiler required too much memory, concluding, "I would have to write a new compiler from scratch. That new compiler is now known as GCC; none of the Pastel compiler is used in it, but I managed to adapt and use the C front end that I had written."  Stallman released his new GNU C compiler March 22, 1987, acknowledging others' contributions, including Tower's, who "wrote parts of the parser, RTL generator, RTL definitions, and of the Vax machine description" based on ideas contributed by Jack Davidson and Christopher Fraser.

Along with Mike Haertel, David Hayes and Stallman, Tower was also one of the initial co-authors of GNU diff, a file comparison utility based on a published algorithm by Eugene Myers.

During the late 1980s and early 1990s, Tower spoke at USENIX conferences as a representative of the FSF.

League for Programming Freedom 
Tower was an early member of the League for Programming Freedom. Through 1991, Tower was one of the organization's two most active speakers, along with Richard Stallman.

References

External links 
 Studio pages at Art.Net
 Website at the Massachusetts Institute of Technology

GNU people
Free software programmers
Free Software Foundation
Massachusetts Institute of Technology School of Science alumni
Brentwood High School (Brentwood, New York) alumni
People from Queens, New York
1949 births
Living people
Activists from New York (state)